Hanover is the capital and largest city of the German state of Lower Saxony. Its 535,932 (2021) inhabitants make it the 13th-largest city in Germany as well as the fourth-largest city in Northern Germany after Berlin, Hamburg and Bremen. Hanover's urban area comprises the towns of Garbsen, Langenhagen and Laatzen and has a population of about 791,000 (2018). The Hanover Region has approximately 1.16 million inhabitants (2019).

The city lies at the confluence of the River Leine and its tributary the Ihme, in the south of the North German Plain, and is the largest city in the Hannover–Braunschweig–Göttingen–Wolfsburg Metropolitan Region. It is the fifth-largest city in the Low German dialect area after Hamburg, Dortmund, Essen and Bremen.

Before it became the capital of Lower Saxony in 1946, Hannover was the capital of the Principality of Calenberg (1636–1692), the Electorate of Hanover (1692–1814), the Kingdom of Hannover (1814–1866), the Province of Hannover of the Kingdom of Prussia (1868–1918), the Province of Hannover of the Free State of Prussia (1918–1946) and of the State of Hanover (1946). From 1714 to 1837 Hannover was by personal union the family seat of the Hanoverian Kings of the United Kingdom of Great Britain and Ireland, under their title of the dukes of Brunswick-Lüneburg (later described as the Elector of Hanover).

The city is a major crossing point of railway lines and motorways (Autobahnen), connecting European main lines in both the east–west (Berlin–Ruhr area/Düsseldorf/Cologne) and north–south (Hamburg–Frankfurt/Stuttgart/Munich) directions. Hannover Airport lies north of the city, in Langenhagen, and is Germany's ninth-busiest airport. The city's most notable institutes of higher education are the Hannover Medical School, one of Germany's leading medical schools, with its university hospital , and the Leibniz University Hannover. The city is also home to International Neuroscience Institute.

The Hanover Fairground, owing to numerous extensions, especially for the Expo 2000, is the largest in the world. Hannover hosts annual commercial trade fairs such as the Hannover Fair and up to 2018 the CeBIT. The IAA Commercial Vehicles show takes place every two years. It is the world's leading trade show for transport, logistics and mobility. Every year Hannover hosts the Schützenfest Hannover, the world's largest marksmen's festival, and the Oktoberfest Hannover.

'Hanover' is the traditional English spelling. The German spelling (with a double n) has become more popular in English; recent editions of encyclopedias prefer the German spelling, and the local government uses the German spelling on English websites. The English pronunciation, with stress on the first syllable, is applied to both the German and English spellings, which is different from German pronunciation, with stress on the second syllable and a long second vowel. The traditional English spelling is still used in historical contexts, especially when referring to the British House of Hanover.

History

Hanover was founded in medieval times on the east bank of the River Leine. Its original name Honovere may mean 'high (river)bank', though this is debated (cf. das Hohe Ufer). Hanover was a small village of ferrymen and fishermen that became a comparatively large town in the 13th century, receiving town privileges in 1241, owing to its position at a natural crossroads. As overland travel was relatively difficult its position on the upper navigable reaches of the river helped it to grow by increasing trade. It was connected to the Hanseatic League city of Bremen by the Leine and was situated near the southern edge of the wide North German Plain and north-west of the Harz mountains, so that east–west traffic such as mule trains passed through it. Hanover was thus a gateway to the Rhine, Ruhr and Saar river valleys, their industrial areas which grew up to the southwest and the plains regions to the east and north, for overland traffic skirting the Harz between the Low Countries and Saxony or Thuringia.

In the 14th century the main churches of Hanover were built, as well as a city wall with three city gates. The beginning of industrialization in Germany led to trade in iron and silver from the northern Harz Mountains, which increased the city's importance.

In 1636 George, Duke of Brunswick-Lüneburg, ruler of the Brunswick-Lüneburg principality of Calenberg, moved his residence to Hanover. The Dukes of Brunswick-Lüneburg were elevated by the Holy Roman Emperor to the rank of Prince-Elector in 1692 and this elevation was confirmed by the Imperial Diet in 1708. Thus the principality was upgraded to the Electorate of Brunswick-Lüneburg, colloquially known as the Electorate of Hanover after Calenberg's capital (see also: House of Hanover). Its Electors later become monarchs of Great Britain (and from 1801 of the United Kingdom of Great Britain and Ireland). The first of these was George I Louis, who acceded to the British throne in 1714. The last British monarch who reigned in Hanover was William IV. Semi-Salic law, which required succession by the male line if possible, forbade the accession of Queen Victoria in Hanover. As a male-line descendant of George I, Queen Victoria was herself a member of the House of Hanover. Her descendants, however, bore her husband's titular name of Saxe-Coburg-Gotha. Three kings of Great Britain, or the United Kingdom, were concurrently also Electoral Princes of Hanover.

During the time of the personal union of the crowns of the United Kingdom and Hanover (1714–1837) the monarchs rarely visited the city. In fact during the reigns of the final three joint rulers (1760–1837) there was only one short visit, by George IV in 1821. From 1816 to 1837 Viceroy Adolphus represented the monarch in Hanover.

During the Seven Years' War the Battle of Hastenbeck was fought near the city on 26 July 1757. The French army defeated the Hanoverian Army of Observation, leading to the city's occupation as part of the Invasion of Hanover. It was recaptured by Anglo-German forces led by Ferdinand of Brunswick the following year.

19th century

After Napoleon imposed the Convention of Artlenburg (Convention of the Elbe) on 5 July 1803, about 35,000 French soldiers occupied Hanover. The convention also required disbanding the army of Hanover. However, George III did not recognise the Convention of the Elbe. This resulted in a great number of soldiers from Hanover eventually emigrating to Great Britain, where the King's German Legion was formed. It was only troops from Hanover and Brunswick that consistently opposed France throughout the entire Napoleonic wars. The Legion later played an important role in the Peninsular War and the Battle of Waterloo in 1815. In 1814 the electorate became the Kingdom of Hanover.

In 1837, the personal union of the United Kingdom and Hanover ended because William IV's heir in the United Kingdom was female (Queen Victoria). Hanover could be inherited only by male heirs. Thus, Hanover passed to William IV's brother, Ernest Augustus, and remained a kingdom until 1866, when it was annexed by Prussia during the Austro-Prussian war. Despite Hanover being expected to defeat Prussia at the Battle of Langensalza, Prussia employed Moltke the Elder's Kesselschlacht order of battle to instead destroy the Hanoverian army. The city of Hanover became the capital of the Prussian Province of Hanover.

In 1842 the first horse railway was inaugurated, and from 1893 an electric tram was installed.

Nazi Germany
After 1937 the lord mayor and the state commissioners of Hanover were members of the NSDAP (Nazi party). A large Jewish population then existed in Hanover. In October 1938, 484 Hanoverian Jews of Polish origin were expelled to Poland, including the Grynszpan family. However, Poland refused to accept them, leaving them stranded at the border with thousands of other Polish-Jewish deportees, fed only intermittently by the Polish Red Cross and Jewish welfare organisations. The Grynszpans' son Herschel Grynszpan was in Paris at the time. When he learned of what was happening, he drove to the German embassy in Paris and shot the German diplomat Eduard Ernst vom Rath, who died shortly afterwards.

The Nazis took this act as a pretext to stage a nationwide pogrom known as Kristallnacht (9 November 1938). On that day, the synagogue of Hanover, designed in 1870 by Edwin Oppler in neo-romantic style, was burnt by the Nazis.

In September 1941, through the "Action Lauterbacher" plan, a ghettoisation of the remaining Hanoverian Jewish families began. Even before the Wannsee Conference, on 15 December 1941, the first Jews from Hanover were deported to Riga. A total of 2,400 people were deported, and very few survived. During the war seven concentration camps were constructed in Hanover, in which many Jews were confined. Of the approximately 4,800 Jews who had lived in Hannover in 1938, fewer than 100 were still in the city when troops of the United States Army arrived on 10 April 1945 to occupy Hanover at the end of the war. Today, a memorial at the Opera Square is a reminder of the persecution of the Jews in Hanover. 
After the war a large group of Orthodox Jewish survivors of the nearby Bergen-Belsen concentration camp settled in Hanover.

World War II

As an important railway and road junction and production centre, Hanover was a major target for strategic bombing during World War II, including the Oil Campaign. Targets included the AFA (Stöcken), the Deurag-Nerag refinery (Misburg), the Continental plants (Vahrenwald and Limmer), the United light metal works (VLW) in Ricklingen and Laatzen (today Hanover fairground), the Hanover/Limmer rubber reclamation plant, the Hanomag factory (Linden) and the tank factory M.N.H. Maschinenfabrik Niedersachsen (Badenstedt). Residential areas were also targeted, and more than 6,000 civilians were killed by the Allied bombing raids. More than 90% of the city centre was destroyed in a total of 88 bombing raids. After the war, the Aegidienkirche was not rebuilt and its ruins were left as a war memorial.

The Allied ground advance into Germany reached Hanover in April 1945. The US 84th Infantry Division captured the city on 10 April 1945.

Hanover was in the British zone of occupation of Germany and became part of the new state (Land) of Lower Saxony in 1946.

Today Hanover is a vice-president city of Mayors for Peace, an international mayoral organisation mobilising cities and citizens worldwide to abolish and eliminate nuclear weapons by 2020.

Geography

Climate
Hanover has an oceanic climate (Köppen: Cfb) independent of the isotherm. Although the city is not on a coastal location, the predominant air masses are still from the ocean, unlike other places further east or south-central Germany.

Subdivisions

The city of Hanover is divided into 13 boroughs (Stadtbezirke) and 53 quarters (Stadtteile).

Boroughs
 Mitte
 Vahrenwald-List
 Bothfeld-Vahrenheide
 Buchholz-Kleefeld
 Misburg-Anderten
 Kirchrode-Bemerode-Wülferode
 Südstadt-Bult
 Döhren-Wülfel
 Ricklingen
 Linden-Limmer
 Ahlem-Badenstedt-Davenstedt
 Herrenhausen-Stöcken
 Nord

Quarters
A selection of the 53 quarters:
 Nordstadt
 Südstadt
 Oststadt
 Zoo (for the zoo itself, see Hanover Zoo)
 Herrenhausen
 Waldheim

Politics

Mayor

The current mayor of Hanover is Belit Onay of the Alliance 90/The Greens since 2019. The most recent mayoral election was held on 17 October 2019, with a runoff held on 10 November, and the results were as follows:

! rowspan=2 colspan=2| Candidate
! rowspan=2| Party
! colspan=2| First round
! colspan=2| Second round
|-
! Votes
! %
! Votes
! %
|-
| bgcolor=| 
| align=left| Belit Onay
| align=left| Alliance 90/The Greens
| 60,096
| 32.2
| 92,146
| 52.9
|-
| bgcolor=| 
| align=left| Eckhard Scholz
| align=left| Independent (CDU)
| 60,046
| 32.2
| 82,116
| 47.1
|-
| bgcolor=| 
| align=left| Marc Hansmann
| align=left| Social Democratic Party
| 43,727
| 23.5
|-
| bgcolor=| 
| align=left| Joachim Wundrak
| align=left| Alternative for Germany
| 8,645
| 4.6
|-
| bgcolor=| 
| align=left| Jessica Kaußen
| align=left| The Left
| 3,628
| 1.9
|-
| bgcolor=| 
| align=left| Iyabo Kaczmarek
| align=left| Independent
| 3,593
| 1.9
|-
| bgcolor=| 
| align=left| Catharina Gutwerk
| align=left| Die PARTEI
| 2,886
| 1.5
|-
| bgcolor=| 
| align=left| Bruno Adam Wolf
| align=left| Pirate Party
| 2,382
| 1.3
|-
| bgcolor=| 
| align=left| Ruth Esther Gilmore
| align=left| Independent
| 841
| 0.5
|-
| bgcolor=| 
| align=left| Julian Klippert
| align=left| Independent
| 536
| 0.3
|-
! colspan=3| Valid votes
! 186,380
! 99.7
! 174,262
! 99.6
|-
! colspan=3| Invalid votes
! 647
! 0.3
! 769
! 0.4
|-
! colspan=3| Total
! 187,027
! 100.0
! 175,031
! 100.0
|-
! colspan=3| Electorate/voter turnout
! 401,847
! 46.5
! 402,129
! 43.5
|-
| colspan=7| Source: City of Hanover (1st round, 2nd round)
|}

City council

The Hanover city council governs the city alongside the mayor. The most recent city council election was held on 12 September 2021, and the results were as follows:

! colspan=2| Party
! Votes
! %
! +/-
! Seats
! +/-
|-
| bgcolor=| 
| align=left| Alliance 90/The Greens (Grüne)
| 165,105
| 27.8
|  11.5
| 18
|  8
|-
| bgcolor=| 
| align=left| Social Democratic Party (SPD)
| 164,431
| 27.7
|  3.7
| 18
|  2
|-
| bgcolor=| 
| align=left| Christian Democratic Union (CDU)
| 123,181
| 20.7
|  3.7
| 13
|  3
|-
| bgcolor=| 
| align=left| Free Democratic Party (FDP)
| 35,917
| 6.0
|  0.9
| 4
|  1
|-
| bgcolor=| 
| align=left| The Left (Die Linke)
| 33,019
| 5.6
|  1.4
| 4
|  1
|-
| bgcolor=| 
| align=left| Alternative for Germany (AfD)
| 25,302
| 4.3
|  4.3
| 3
|  3
|-
| bgcolor=| 
| align=left| Die PARTEI (PARTEI)
| 13,853
| 2.3
|  0.6
| 1
| ±0
|-
| 
| align=left| The Hanoverians (HAN)
| 7,044
| 1.2
|  1.6
| 1
|  1
|-
| bgcolor=| 
| align=left| Pirate Party (Piraten)
| 7,089
| 1.2
|  0.9
| 1
| ±0
|-
| bgcolor=| 
| align=left| Volt Germany (Volt)
| 10,135
| 1.7
| New
| 1
| New
|-
| colspan=7 bgcolor=lightgrey| 
|-
| 
| align=left| Climate Alliance Hanover
| 4,022
| 0.7
| New
| 0
| New
|-
| bgcolor=| 
| align=left| Free Voters (FW)
| 3,126
| 0.5
| New
| 0
| New
|-
| bgcolor=| 
| align=left| Grassroots Democratic Party (dieBasis)
| 1,981
| 0.3
| New
| 0
| New
|-
| 
| align=left| Active for a Social Hanover (ASH)
| 260
| 0.0
| New
| 0
| New
|-
! colspan=2| Total
! 594,465
! 100.0
! 
! 
! 
|-
! colspan=2| Valid votes
! 201,998
! 98.8
! 
! 
! 
|-
! colspan=2| Invalid votes
! 2,373
! 1.2
! 
! 
! 
|-
! colspan=2| Total
! 204,371
! 100.0
! 
! 64
! ±0
|-
! colspan=2| Electorate/voter turnout
! 398,328
! 51.3
!  0.2
! 
! 
|-
| colspan=7| Source: City of Hanover
|}

Main sights

One of Hanover's sights is the Royal Gardens of Herrenhausen. Its Great Garden is an important European Baroque garden. The palace itself was largely destroyed by Allied bombing but has been reconstructed and reopened in 2013. Among the points of interest is the Grotto. Its interior was designed by French artist Niki de Saint Phalle). The Great Garden consists of several parts and contains Europe's highest garden fountain. The historic Garden Theatre hosted the musicals of the German rock musician Heinz Rudolf Kunze.

Also at Herrenhausen, the Berggarten is a botanical garden with the most varied collection of orchids in Europe. Some points of interest are the Tropical House, the Cactus House, the Canary House and the Orchid House, and free-flying birds and butterflies. Near the entrance to the Berggarten is the historic Library Pavillon. The Mausoleum of the Guelphs is also located in the Berggarten. Like the Great Garden, the Berggarten also consists of several parts, for example the Paradies and the Prairie Garden. The Georgengarten is an English landscape garden. The Leibniz Temple and the Georgen Palace are two points of interest there.

The landmark of Hanover is the New Town Hall (Neues Rathaus). Inside the building are four scale models of the city. A worldwide unique diagonal/arch elevator goes up the large dome at a 17 degree angle to an observation deck.

The Hanover Zoo received the Park Scout Award for the fourth year running in 2009/10, placing it among the best zoos in Germany. The zoo consists of several theme areas: Sambesi, Meyers Farm, Gorilla-Mountain, Jungle-Palace, and Mullewapp. Some smaller areas are Australia, the wooded area for wolves, and the so-called swimming area with many seabirds. There is also a tropical house, a jungle house, and a show arena. The new Canadian-themed area, Yukon Bay, opened in 2010. In 2010 the Hanover Zoo had over 1.6 million visitors. There is also the Sea Life Centre Hanover, which is the first tropical aquarium in Germany.

Another point of interest is the Old Town. In the centre are the large Marktkirche (Church St. Georgii et Jacobi, preaching venue of the bishop of the Lutheran Landeskirche Hannovers) and the Old Town Hall. Nearby are the Leibniz House, the Nolte House, and the Beguine Tower. The Kreuz-Church-Quarter around the Kreuz Church contains many little lanes. Nearby is the old royal sports hall, now called the Ballhof theatre. On the edge of the Old Town are the Market Hall, the Leine Palace, and the ruin of the Aegidien Church which is now a monument to the victims of war and violence. Through the Marstall Gate the bank of the river Leine can be reached; the Nanas of Niki de Saint Phalle are located here. They are part of the Mile of Sculptures, which starts from Trammplatz, leads along the river bank, crosses Königsworther Square, and ends at the entrance of the Georgengarten. Near the Old Town is the district of Calenberger Neustadt where the Catholic Basilica Minor of St. Clemens, the Reformed Church and the Lutheran Neustädter Hof- und Stadtkirche St. Johannis are located.

Some other popular sights are the Waterloo Column, the Laves House, the Wangenheim Palace, the Lower Saxony State Archives, the Hanover Playhouse, the Kröpcke Clock, the Anzeiger Tower Block, the Administration Building of the NORD/LB, the Cupola Hall of the Congress Centre, the Lower Saxony Stock, the Ministry of Finance, the Garten Church, the Luther Church, the Gehry Tower (designed by the American architect Frank O. Gehry), the specially designed Bus Stops, the Opera House, the Central Station, the Maschsee lake and the city forest Eilenriede, which is one of the largest of its kind in Europe. With around 40 parks, forests and gardens, a couple of lakes, two rivers and one canal, Hanover offers a large variety of leisure activities.

Since 2007 the historic Leibniz Letters, which can be viewed in the Gottfried Wilhelm Leibniz Library, are on UNESCO's Memory of the World Register.

Outside the city centre is the EXPO-Park, the former site of EXPO 2000. Some points of interest are the Planet M., the former German Pavillon, some nations' vacant pavilions, the Expowale, the EXPO-Plaza and the EXPO-Gardens (Parc Agricole, EXPO-Park South and the Gardens of change). The fairground can be reached by the Exponale, one of the largest pedestrian bridges in Europe.

The Hanover fairground is the largest exhibition centre in the world.
It provides  of covered indoor space,  of open-air space, 27 halls and pavilions. Many of the Exhibition Centre's halls are architectural highlights. Furthermore, it offers the Convention Center with its 35 function rooms, glassed-in areas between halls, grassy park-like recreation zones and its own heliport. Two important sights on the fairground are the Hermes Tower ( high) and the EXPO Roof, the largest wooden roof in the world.

In the district of Anderten is the European Cheese Centre, the only Cheese Experience Centre in Europe. Another tourist sight in Anderten is the Hindenburg Lock, which was the biggest lock in Europe at the time of its construction in 1928. The Tiergarten (literally the "animals' garden") in the district of Kirchrode is a large forest originally used for deer and other game for the king's table.

In the district of Groß-Buchholz the  Telemax is located, which is the tallest building in Lower Saxony and the highest television tower in Northern Germany. Some other notable towers are the VW-Tower in the city centre and the old towers of the former middle-age defence belt: Döhrener Tower, Lister Tower and the Horse Tower.

The 36 most important sights of the city centre are connected with a  red line, which is painted on the pavement. This so-called Red Thread marks out a walk that starts at the Tourist Information Office and ends on the Ernst-August-Square in front of the central station. There is also a guided sightseeing-bus tour through the city.

Demographics

Hanover has a population of about 540,000. It is the largest city in Lower Saxony by area and population and is the 13th largest city in Germany. Hanover Region, a district that surrounds the city of Hanover and cities like Langenhagen, Garbsen and Laatzen has a population of about 1,160,000 and is the largest District (Landkreis) in Germany. Hanover metropolitan region, which includes also cities like Braunschweig and Göttingen has a population of about 3,850,000 and is the 8th largest metropolitan area in Germany. Hanover passed 100,000 in 1875 and Hanover‘s population grow since 1946, when Hanover became the capital of Lower Saxony state and it grow rapidly in 1950s and 60s due to West German Wirtschaftswunder. This also saw the growth of large migrant population, drawn largely from Turkey, Greece and Italy. Hanover has also one of the largest Vietnamese community in former West Germany, due to its close distance from former East Germany. The Viên Giác pagoda in Hanover is the largest Vietnamese pagoda and one of the largest in Europe. Hanover is one of the liveable cities due to its good location and good size of population. Hanover is also one the largest hub in Germany, by highways, train station and airport, where many people come or transfer in Hanover everyday.

Society and culture

Religious life
Hanover is headquarters for several Protestant organizations, including the World Communion of Reformed Churches, the Evangelical Church in Germany, the Reformed Alliance, the United Evangelical Lutheran Church of Germany, and the Independent Evangelical-Lutheran Church.

In 2015, 31.1% of the population were Protestant and 13.4% were Roman Catholic. The majority 55.5% were irreligious or other faith.

Museums and galleries

The Historisches Museum Hannover (Historic museum) describes the history of Hanover, from the medieval settlement "Honovere" to the city of today. The museum focuses on the period from 1714 to 1834 when Hanover had a strong relationship with the British royal house.

With more than 4,000 members, the Kestnergesellschaft is the largest art society in Germany. The museum hosts exhibitions from classical modernist art to contemporary art. Emphasis is placed on film, video, contemporary music and architecture, room installments and presentations of contemporary paintings, sculptures and video art.

The Kestner-Museum is located in the House of 5.000 windows. The museum is named after August Kestner and exhibits 6,000 years of applied art in four areas: Ancient cultures, ancient Egypt, applied art and a valuable collection of historic coins.

The KUBUS is a forum for contemporary art. It features mostly exhibitions and projects of artists from Hanover.

The Kunstverein Hannover (Art Society Hanover) shows contemporary art and was established in 1832 as one of the first art societies in Germany. It is located in the Künstlerhaus (House of artists). There are around seven international exhibitions each year.

The Landesmuseum Hannover is the largest museum in Hanover. The art gallery shows European art from the 11th to the 20th century, the nature department shows the zoology, geology, botanic, geology and a vivarium with fish, insects, reptiles and amphibians. The primeval department shows the primeval history of Lower Saxony, and the folklore department shows cultures from all over the world.

The Sprengel Museum shows the art of the 20th century. It is one of the most notable art museums in Germany. The focus is put on the classical modernist art with the collection of Kurt Schwitters, works of German expressionism, and French cubism, the cabinet of abstracts, the graphics and the department of photography and media. Furthermore, the museum shows the works of the French artist Niki de Saint-Phalle.

The Theatre Museum shows an exhibition of the history of the theatre in Hanover from the 17th century up to now: opera, concert, drama and ballet. The museum also hosts several touring exhibitions during the year.

The Wilhelm Busch Museum is the German Museum of Caricature and Critical Graphic Arts. The collection of the works of Wilhelm Busch and the extensive collection of cartoons and critical graphics is unique in Germany. Furthermore, the museum hosts several exhibitions of national and international artists during the year.

A cabinet of coins is the Münzkabinett der TUI-AG. The Polizeigeschichtliche Sammlung Niedersachsen is the largest police museum in Germany. Textiles from all over the world can be visited in the Museum for textile art. The EXPOseeum is the museum of the world-exhibition "EXPO 2000 Hannover". Carpets and objects from the orient can be visited in the Oriental Carpet Museum. The Museum for the visually impaired is a rarity in Germany, there is only one other of its kind in Berlin. The Museum of veterinary medicine is unique in Germany. The Museum for Energy History describes the 150 years old history of the application of energy. The Heimat-Museum Ahlem shows the history of the district of Ahlem. The Mahn- und Gedenkstätte Ahlem describes the history of the Jewish people in Hanover and the Stiftung Ahlers Pro Arte / Kestner Pro Arte shows modern art. Modern art is also the main topic of the Kunsthalle Faust, the Nord/LB Art Gallery and of the Foro Artistico / Eisfabrik.

Some leading art events in Hanover are the Long Night of the Museums and the Zinnober Kunstvolkslauf which features all the galleries in Hanover.

People who are interested in astronomy should visit the Observatory Geschwister Herschel on the Lindener Mountain or the small planetarium inside of the Bismarck School.

Theatre, cabaret and musical

Around 40 theatres are located in Hanover. The Opera House, the Schauspielhaus (Play House), the Ballhof eins, the Ballhof zwei and the Cumberlandsche Galerie belong to the Lower Saxony State Theatre. The Theater am Aegi is Hanover's principal theatre for musicals, shows and guest performances. The Neues Theater (New Theatre) is the boulevard theatre of Hanover. The Theater für Niedersachsen is another large theatre in Hanover, which also has an own musical company. Some of the most important musical productions are the rock musicals of the German rock musician Heinz Rudolph Kunze, which take place at the Garden-Theatre in the Great Garden.

Some important theatre events are the Tanztheater International, the Long Night of the Theatres, the Festival Theaterformen and the International Competition for Choreographers.

Hanover's leading cabaret stage is the GOP Variety theatre which is located in the Georgs Palace. Some other cabaret-stages are the Variety Marlene, the Uhu-Theatre. the theatre Die Hinterbühne, the Rampenlich Variety and the revue-stage TAK. The most important cabaret event is the Kleines Fest im Großen Garten (Little Festival in the Great Garden) which is the most successful cabaret festival in Germany. It features artists from around the world. Some other important events are the Calenberger Cabaret Weeks, the Hanover Cabaret Festival and the Wintervariety.

Music

Classical music
Hanover has two symphony orchestras: The Lower Saxon State Orchestra Hanover and the NDR Radiophilharmonie (North German Radio Philharmonic Orchestra). Two notable choirs have their homes in Hanover: the Mädchenchor Hannover (girls' choir) and the Knabenchor Hannover (boys' choir).

There are two major international competitions for classical music in Hanover:
 Hanover International Violin Competition (since 1991)
 Classica Nova International Music Competition (1997) (Non profit association Classica Nova exists in Hanover with the aim of continuing the Classica Nova competition).

Popular music
The rock bands Scorpions and Fury in the Slaughterhouse are originally from Hanover. Acclaimed DJ Mousse T also has his main recording studio in the area. Rick J. Jordan, member of the band Scooter was born here in 1968. Eurovision Song Contest winner of 2010, Lena, is also from Hanover.

Sport
Hannover 96 (nickname Die Roten or 'The Reds') is the top local football team that currently plays in the 2. Bundesliga. Home games are played at the HDI-Arena, which hosted matches in the 1974 and 2006 World Cups and the Euro 1988. Their reserve team Hannover 96 II plays in the fourth league. Their home games were played in the traditional Eilenriedestadium until they moved to the HDI Arena due to DFL directives. Arminia Hannover is another traditional soccer team in Hanover that has played in the second division (then 2. Liga Nord) for years and plays now in the Niedersachsen-West Liga (Lower Saxony League West). Home matches are played in the Rudolf-Kalweit-Stadium.

The Hannover Indians are the local ice hockey team. They play in the third tier. Their home games are played at the traditional Eisstadion am Pferdeturm. The Hannover Scorpions played in Hanover in Germany's top league until 2013 when they sold their license and moved to Langenhagen.

Hanover was one of the rugby union capitals in Germany. The first German rugby team was founded in Hanover in 1878. Hanover-based teams dominated the German rugby scene for a long time. DRC Hannover plays in the first division, and SV Odin von 1905 as well as SG 78/08 Hannover play in the second division.

Hanover has traditionally been one of Germany's hubs in Water sports and especially in Water polo. The SG Waspo'98 Hannover won the Deutsche Wasserball-Liga in 2020 and 2021. In total, clubs from Hanover have won the German championship 11 times. Thanks to the Maschsee lake, the rivers Ihme and Leine and to the Mittellandkanal channel, Hanover hosts sailing schools, yacht schools, waterski clubs, rowing clubs, canoe clubs and paddle clubs.

The first German fencing club was founded in Hanover in 1862. Today there are three additional fencing clubs in Hanover.

The Hannover Korbjäger are the city's top basketball team. They play their home games at the IGS Linden.

The Hannover Regents play in the third Bundesliga (baseball) division. The Hannover Grizzlies, Armina Spartans and Hannover Stampeders are the local American football teams.

The Hannover Marathon is the biggest running event in Hanover with more than 11,000 participants and usually around 200,000 spectators. Some other important running events are the Gilde Stadtstaffel (relay), the Sport-Check Nachtlauf (night-running), the Herrenhäuser Team-Challenge, the Hannoversche Firmenlauf (company running) and the Silvesterlauf (sylvester running).

Hanover also hosts an important international cycle race: The Nacht von Hannover (night of Hanover). The race takes place around the Market Hall.

The lake Maschsee hosts the International Dragon Boat Races and the Canoe Polo-Tournament. Many regattas take place during the year. "Head of the river Leine" on the river Leine is one of the biggest rowing regattas in Hanover. One of Germany's most successful dragon boat teams, the All Sports Team Hannover, which has won since its foundation in year 2000 more than 100 medals on national and international competitions, is doing practising on the Maschsee in the heart of Hannover. The All Sports Team has received the award "Team of the Year 2013" in Lower Saxony.

Some other important sport events are the Lower Saxony Beach Volleyball Tournament, the international horse show "German Classics" and the international ice hockey tournament Nations Cup.

Regular events

Hanover is one of the leading exhibition cities in the world. It hosts more than 60 international and national exhibitions every year. The most popular ones are the CeBIT, the Hanover Fair, the Domotex, the Ligna, the IAA Nutzfahrzeuge and the Agritechnica. Hanover also hosts a huge number of congresses and symposiums like the International Symposium on Society and Resource Management.

Hanover is also host to the Schützenfest Hannover, the largest marksmen's fun fair in the world which takes place once a year from late June to early July. Founded in 1529, it consists of more than 260 rides and inns, five large beer tents and a large entertainment programme. The highlight of this fun fair is the  Parade of the Marksmen with more than 12,000 participants from all over the world, including around 5,000 marksmen, 128 bands, and more than 70 wagons, carriages, and other festival vehicles. This makes it the longest procession in Europe. Around 2 million people visit this fun fair every year.

Hanover also hosts one of the two largest spring festivals in Europe, with around 180 rides and inns, 2 large beer tents, and around 1.5 million visitors each year. The Oktoberfest Hannover is the second largest Oktoberfest in the world with around 160 rides and inns, two large beer tents and around 1 million visitors each year.

The Maschsee Festival takes place around the Maschsee Lake. Each year around 2 million visitors come to enjoy live music, comedy, cabaret, and much more. It is the largest Volksfest of its kind in Northern Germany. The Great Garden hosts every year the International Fireworks Competition, and the International Festival Weeks Herrenhausen, with music and cabaret performances.

Other festivals include the Festival Feuer und Flamme (Fire and Flames), the Gartenfestival (Garden Festival), the Herbstfestival (Autumn Festival), the Harley Days, the Steintor Festival (Steintor is a party area in the city centre) and the Lister-Meile-Festival (Lister Meile is a large pedestrian area).

Hanover also hosts food-oriented festivals including the Wine Festival and the Gourmet Festival. It also hosts some special markets like the Old Town Flea Market and the Market for Art and Trade. Some other major markets include the Christmas Markets of the City of Hanover in the Old Town and city centre, and the Lister Meile.

Tourism
Hanover is a attractive tourist place due to its many sights and famous events. Hanover had about 580,000 visitors in 2021, where most foreign visitors were from the Netherlands and the United Kingdom. Famous sights in Hanover are New Town Hall, Herrenhausen Gardens and Hanover Zoo, which is one of the largest Zoos in Germany. Hannover Messe, which is active since 1947, is also a attractive place for visitors, which has about 250,000 visitors every year. Hanover Messe is dedicated to the topic of industry development. Hanover Messe is one of the world’s largest trade fairs and it has the largest fairground in the world.

Transport

Rail
The city's central station, Hannover Hauptbahnhof, is a hub of the German high-speed ICE network. It is the starting point of the Hanover-Würzburg high-speed rail line and also the central hub for the Hanover S-Bahn. It offers many international and national connections.

Air
Hanover and its area is served by Hannover Airport (IATA code: HAJ; ICAO code: EDDV) in Langenhagen.

Road
Hanover is also an important hub of Germany's autobahn network; the junction of two major autobahns, the A2 and A7 is at Kreuz Hannover-Ost, at the northeastern edge of the city.

Local autobahns are A 352 (a short cut between A7 [north] and A2 [west], also known as the Airport autobahn because it passes Hanover Airport) and the A 37.

The expressway system, a number of Bundesstraße roads, forms a structure loosely resembling a large ring road together with A2 and A7. The roads are B 3, B 6 and Bundesstraße 65|B 65, called Westschnellweg (B6 on the northern part, B3 on the southern part), Messeschnellweg (B3, becomes A37 near Burgdorf, crosses A2, becomes B3 again, changes to B6 at Seelhorster Kreuz, then passes the Hanover fairground as B6 and becomes A37 again before merging into A7) and Südschnellweg (starts out as B65, becomes B3/B6/B65 upon crossing Westschnellweg, then becomes B65 again at Seelhorster Kreuz).

Bus and light rail

Hanover has an extensive Stadtbahn and bus system, operated by üstra. The city uses designer buses and tramways, the TW 6000 and TW 2000 trams being examples.

Bicycle
Bicycle paths are very common in the city centre. At off-peak hours you are allowed to take your bike on a tram or bus.

Economy

Various industrial businesses are located in Hannover. The Volkswagen Commercial Vehicles Transporter (VWN) factory at Hannover-Stöcken is the biggest employer in the region and operates a large plant at the northern edge of town adjoining the Mittellandkanal and Motorway A2. Volkswagen shares a coal-burning power plant with a factory of German tire and automobile parts manufacturer Continental AG. Continental AG, founded in Hanover in 1871, is one of the city's major companies. Since 2008 a take-over has been in progress: the Schaeffler Group from Herzogenaurach (Bavaria) holds the majority of Continental's stock but were required due to the financial crisis to deposit the options as securities at banks.

The audio equipment company Sennheiser and the travel group TUI AG are both based in Hanover. Hanover is home to many insurance companies including Talanx, VHV Group, and Concordia Insurance. The major global reinsurance company Hannover Re also has its headquarters east of the city centre.

List of largest employers in Hanover

Key figures
In 2012, the city generated a GDP of €29.5 billion, which is equivalent to €74,822 per employee. The gross value of production in 2012 was €26.4 billion, which is equivalent to €66,822 per employee.

Around 300,000 employees were counted in 2014. Of these, 189,000 had their primary residence in Hanover, while 164,892 commute into the city every day.

In 2014 the city was home to 34,198 businesses, of which 9,342 were registered in the German Trade Register and 24,856 counted as small businesses. Hence, more than half of the metropolitan area's businesses in the German Trade Register are located in Hanover (17,485 total).

Business development
Hannoverimpuls GMBH is a joint business development company from the city and region of Hannover. The company was founded in 2003 and supports the start-up, growth and relocation of businesses in the Hannover Region. The focus is on thirteen sectors, which stand for sustainable economic growth: Automotive, Energy Solutions, Information and Communications Technology, Life Sciences, Optical Technologies, Creative Industries and Production Engineering.

A range of programmes supports companies from the key industries in their expansion plans in Hannover or abroad. Three regional centres specifically promote international economic relations with Russia, India and Turkey.

The Institut für Integrierte Produktion Hannover is a spin-off from Leibniz University Hannover in the field of production technology that promotes transfer of scientific knowledge to business.

Education
The Leibniz University Hannover is the largest funded institution in Hanover for providing higher education to students from around the world. Below are the names of the universities and some of the important schools, including newly opened Hannover Medical Research School in 2003 for attracting the students from biology background from around the world.

There are several universities in Hanover:
 Leibniz University Hannover, host institution to the Max Planck Institute for Gravitational Physics
 Hochschule für Musik, Theater und Medien Hannover
 Hannover Medical School
 School of Veterinary Medicine Hanover (Tierärztliche Hochschule Hannover)
 GISMA Business School, part of the for-profit education company Global University Systems.
There is one University of Applied Science and Arts in Hanover:
 Hochschule Hannover (the former Fachhochschule)

The Schulbiologiezentrum Hannover maintains practical biology schools in four locations (Botanischer Schulgarten Burg, Freiluftschule Burg, Zooschule Hannover, and Botanischer Schulgarten Linden). The University of Veterinary Medicine Hanover also maintains its own botanical garden specializing in medicinal and poisonous plants, the Heil- und Giftpflanzengarten der Tierärztlichen Hochschule Hannover.

Notable people

 Hannah Arendt (1906–1975), American political theorist
 Erdoğan Atalay (born 1966), actor
 Rudolf Augstein (1923–2002), journalist, founder of the weekly journal Der Spiegel
 Hermann Bahlsen (1859–1919), businessman, inventor of the Leibniz-Keks
 Marc Bator (born 1972), journalist
 Rudolf von Bennigsen (1824–1902), liberal politician
 Klaus Bernbacher (born 1931), conductor, music event manager, broadcasting manager and academic teacher
 Count Johann Hartwig Ernst von Bernstorff (1712–1772) a German-Danish statesman
 Andreas Peter Bernstorff (1735–1797), Danish diplomat and Foreign Minister
 Gero von Boehm (born 1954), director, journalist and television presenter
 Emil Berliner (1851–1929), inventor of the phonograph
 Walter Bruch (1908–1990), inventor of the PAL color television system
 Wilhelm Busch (1832–1908), caricaturist, painter and poet
 Laurent Chappuzeau, (ca.1652-??), clockmaker to the Elector of Hanover 1689–1701
 Frederick Dielman (1847–1935), German-American portrait and figure painter
 Albert Christoph Dies (1755–1822), German painter, engraver and biographer
 Johannes Dietwald (born 1985), footballer
 Champion Jack Dupree (1910–1992), American Born Blues Musician
 Frederick, Prince of Wales (1707–1751), eldest son and heir apparent of King George II of Great Britain
 Gustav Fröhlich (1902–1987), actor and film director
 Niclas Füllkrug (born 1993), footballer
 George I, (1660–1727), King of Great Britain and Ireland, prince elector of Hanover
 George II, (1683–1760), King of Great Britain and Ireland, prince elector of Hanover
 George III, (1738–1820), King of Great Britain and Ireland, prince elector of Hanover
 George William Frederick Charles, duke of Cambridge (1819–1904), Prince George
 Gerhard Glogowski (born 1943), politician (SPD)
 Georg Friedrich Grotefend (1775–1853), epigraphist and philologist
 Klaus Meine (born 1948), rock musician, vocalist of the rock band Scorpions
 Fritz Haarmann (1870–1925), prolific serial killer and rapist
 Julia Hamburg (born 1986), politician
 Conrad Wilhelm Hase, (1818–1902), architect, founder of the Hanover school of architecture
 Johann Friedrich Ludwig Hausmann (1782–1859) German mineralogist
 Hilal El-Helwe (born 1994), German-Lebanese football player
 Caroline Herschel (1750–1848) and William Herschel (1738–1822), astronomers
 Wyn Hoop (born 1936), singer
 Alfred Hugenberg (1865–1951), businessman and politician (DNVP)
 August Wilhelm Iffland (1759–1814), German actor and dramatic author
 Manfred Kohrs (born 1957), tattooist, conceptual artist and Master of Economics
 Dr. Gindi (born 1965), contemporary sculptor
 Georg Ludwig Friedrich Laves (1788–1864), architect
 Gottfried Wilhelm Leibniz (1646–1716), philosopher, mathematician, developed differential and integral calculus
 Jan Martín (born 1984), German-Israeli-Spanish basketball player
 Georg Meissner (1829–1905), anatomist and physiologist 
 Per Mertesacker (born 1984), footballer
 Otto Fritz Meyerhof (1884–1951), recipient of the Nobel prize in medicine, 1922
 Lena Meyer-Landrut (born 1991), winner of the Eurovision Song Contest 2010
 Reiner E. Moritz (born 1938), film director and producer
 Georg Heinrich Pertz (1795–1876), German historian.
 Oliver Pocher (born 1978), comedian and television presenter
 Rudolf Erich Raspe (1736–1794), German librarian, writer and scientist
 Daniel Reiss (born 1982), professional ice hockey player
 Waldemar R. Röhrbein (1935–2014), historian, director of Historisches Museum Hannover 
 Wilhelm Georg Friedrich Roscher (1817–1894), German economist
 Dirk Rossmann (born 1946), businessman
 Dieter Roth (1930–1998), artist, print-maker, author, poet and world renowned composer
 Niki de Saint Phalle (1930–2002), sculptor, painter and film maker
 Friedrich Schlegel (1772–1829), poet, literary critic, philosopher and Indologist
 Gerhard Schröder (born 1944), politician (SPD) (former Chancellor of Germany)
 Helga Schuchardt (born 1939), politician and engineer
 Kurt Schumacher (1895–1952), politician, re-organiser of the SPD after World War II
 Kurt Schwitters (1887–1948), artist
 Alexander Moritz Simon (1837–1905), Jewish philanthropist, banker and American vice consul
 Uli Stein (1954–2020), artist, cartoonist
 Charles Wachsmuth (1829–1896), German-American paleontologist and businessman
 Hans Wehrmann (born 1964), entrepreneur, economist, inventor, author and racing driver
 Dirk Werner (born 1981), racing driver
 Phylicia Whitney (born 1950), journalist and public speaker
 Christian Wulff (born 1959), politician (CDU), former President of Germany
 Shlomo Zev Zweigenhaft (1915–2005), Chief Rabbi of Hannover and Lower Saxony
 Anke Blume (1969-), engineering technology professor at the University of Twente known for contributions to silica and silane chemistry for rubber applications.

Twin towns – sister cities

Hanover is twinned with:

 Blantyre, Malawi (1968)
 Bristol, England, United Kingdom (1947)
 Hiroshima, Japan (1983)
 Leipzig, Germany (1987)
 Perpignan, France (1960)
 Poznań, Poland (1979)
 Rouen, France (1966)

Hanover also cooperates with:
 Mykolaiv, Ukraine (2022)

See also

 CeBIT (CeBIT Computer Messe)
 Expo 2000
 Hanover Fair (Hannover Messe)
 History of the Jews in Hannover
 Metropolitan region Hannover-Braunschweig-Göttingen-Wolfsburg
 Schützenfest Hannover

References

Bibliography

External links

 
 Official website for tourism, holiday and leisure in Lower Saxony and Hanover

 
Cities in Lower Saxony
German state capitals
Hanover Region
Members of the Hanseatic League
Holocaust locations in Germany